The Stevens Lakes are a chain of small alpine lakes in Custer County, Idaho, United States, located in the Sawtooth Mountains in the Sawtooth National Recreation Area.  There are no trails leading to the lakes.

The Stevens Lakes are in the Fishhook Creek drainage and the Sawtooth Wilderness. A wilderness permit can be obtained at a registration box at trailheads or wilderness boundaries.

See also

 List of lakes of the Sawtooth Mountains (Idaho)
 Sawtooth National Forest
 Sawtooth National Recreation Area
 Sawtooth Range (Idaho)

References

Lakes of Idaho
Lakes of Custer County, Idaho
Glacial lakes of the United States
Glacial lakes of the Sawtooth Wilderness